Koduru Ishwara Varaprasad Reddy  (born 17 November 1948) is an Indian entrepreneur and founder of vaccine manufacturing company Shantha Biotechnics. The Govt of India awarded him the Padma Bhushan award in 2005 for his contribution in the field of science and engineering. He also received an honorary doctorate from Sri Venkateshwara University, Gitam University, and Vignan University for his pioneering efforts.

Early life
Dr. K.I Varaprasad Reddy was born in an agriculture family from Papireddy Palem village in Nellore district. He was the only child to his parents Mr Venkata Ramana Reddy and Mrs Shanthamma. With Bachelor of Science degree from Sri Venkateshwara University in 1967, he did his Engineering (Electronics & Communication) from Andhra University – 1970. After which he pursued a Diploma in Computer Sciences from Biblingen University, West Germany in 1971. He also got his master's degree in Business Administration from Osmania University.

An electronics engineer by profession, Varaprasad worked as a defense scientist for 7 years. after which he worked for APIDC (Andhra Pradesh Industrial Development Corporation). He has become entrepreneur by joining Hyderabad Batteries Ltd in the year 1985. This company developed and produced batteries for high technology based batteries for Defence applications.

Shantha Biotechnics Limited
In 1990, he attended a WHO conference in Geneva and he heard some critical remarks about India not being capable of developing a vaccine for Hepatitis B. The disease kills around 350,000 people every year in the country.
He was not pleased with what he heard and started Shantha Biotechnics Ltd with a mission to produce cost-effective vaccines that would be available for the common man, while still maintaining international quality standards.

Varaprasad established Shantha Biotechnics Ltd. in 1993. Shantha Biotechnics Ltd made the country's first indigenously developed recombinant hepatitis B vaccine. The vaccine, Shanvac-B, was launched in the country in 1997.

Other activities
He supported Yoga for training many yoga teachers for spreading the yoga culture. He also launched a magazine, Haasam and ran for 5 years. The main aim was to propagate the spirit of Telugu art, literature and humour and music. Now under Haasam Publications many books were published and continuing to publish on the subjects of Music, Humour and spirituality. Some of the well known books are Autobiography of Bharta Ratna M S Subbulakshmi and Mallapudi Venkataramana's Kothi Kommachi etc.,

References

1948 births
Indian publishers (people)
People from Nellore
Indian company founders
Indian businesspeople in the pharmaceutical industry
Recipients of the Padma Bhushan in science & engineering
20th-century Indian businesspeople
Indian industrialists
Living people